The 2007 Korean Tour was a season on the Korean Tour, a series of professional golf tournaments. The table below shows the season results.

Schedule
The following table lists official events during the 2007 season.

Order of Merit
The Order of Merit was based on prize money won during the season, calculated using a points-based system.

Notes

References

External links

2007 Korean Tour
2007 in golf
2007 in South Korean sport